Carl-Heinz Birnbacher (26 May 1910 – 5 December 1991) was an admiral in the West German Navy. During World War II, he served in the Kriegsmarine and was a recipient of the Knight's Cross of the Iron Cross of Nazi Germany.

Awards 
 Iron Cross (1939)  2nd Class (9 April 1940) & 1st Class (20 April 1940)
 Wound Badge in Black (15 May 1940)
 German Cross in Gold on 10 November 1942 as Kapitänleutnant in the 1. Schnellbootsflottille
 Knight's Cross of the Iron Cross on 17 June 1940 as Kapitänleutnant and chief of the 1. Schnellbootsflottille
 Großes Bundesverdienstkreuz (September 1970)

References

Citations

Bibliography

1910 births
1991 deaths
Austrian military personnel of World War II
Bundesmarine admirals
Commanders Crosses of the Order of Merit of the Federal Republic of Germany
Counter admirals of the German Navy
Kriegsmarine personnel of World War II
People from Villach
Recipients of the Gold German Cross
Recipients of the Knight's Cross of the Iron Cross
Reichsmarine personnel